Tricolia tenuis is a species of sea snail, a marine gastropod mollusk in the family Phasianellidae.

Description
The size of the shell varies between 6 mm and 11 mm. The oval, elongated shell is rather thin, and shining. The elevated spire has a conic shape. It is composed of 4–5 somewhat convex whorls, separated by slightly impressed sutures. The aperture is rounded oval. The columella is arcuate. The color of the shell is yellowish or rose, with red and white flammules and decurrent lines,
sometimes punctate with red.

Distribution
This marine species occurs in the Mediterranean Sea, the Black Sea; in the Atlantic Ocean off the Azores, Cape Verde Islands and West Africa.

References

 Coen, G. (1933). Saggio di una Sylloge Molluscorum Adriaticorum. Memorie del Regio Comitato Talassografico Italiano. 192: i-vii, 1-186
 Gofas, S.; Le Renard, J.; Bouchet, P. (2001). Mollusca, in: Costello, M.J. et al. (Ed.) (2001). European register of marine species: a check-list of the marine species in Europe and a bibliography of guides to their identification. Collection Patrimoines Naturels, 50: pp. 180–213

External links
 
 Monterosato, T. A. di. (1917). Molluschi viventi e quaternari raccolti lungo le coste della Tripolitania dall'ing. Camillo Crema. Bollettino della Società Zoologica Italiana. ser. 3, 4: 1-28, pl. 1
 Scacchi, A. (1836). Catalogus conchyliorum Regni Neapolitani. Neapoli [Naples: Typis Filiatre-Sebetii. 18 p., 1 pl.]
 Michaud, A.-L.-G. (1829). Description de plusieurs espèces nouvelles de coquilles vivantes. Bulletin d'Histoire Naturelle de la Société Linnéenne de Bordeaux. 3: 260-276, pl.
 Brusina, S. (1865). Conchiglie dalmate inedite. Verhandlungen der Kaiserlich-königlichen Zoologisch-botanisch Gesellschaft in Wien. 15: 3-42
 Bucquoy E., Dautzenberg P. & Dollfus G. (1882-1886). Les mollusques marins du Roussillon. Tome Ier. Gastropodes. Paris: Baillière & fils. 570 pp., 66 pls
 Monterosato, T. A. di. (1883-1885). Conchiglie littorali mediterranee. Il Naturalista Siciliano. [1 3(3): 87–91]
 Monterosato, T. A. di. (1884). Nomenclatura generica e specifica di alcune conchiglie mediterranee. Virzi, printed for the author, Palermo, 152 pp
 Monterosato, T. A. di. (1917). Molluschi viventi e quaternari raccolti lungo le coste della Tripolitania dall'ing. Camillo Crema. Bollettino della Società Zoologica Italiana. ser. 3, 4: 1-28, pl. 1
 Pallary, P. (1900). Coquilles marines du littoral du département d'Oran. Journal de Conchyliologie. 48(3): 211-42
 Philippi, R. A. (1844). Nachtrag zum zweiten Bande der Enumeratio Molluscorum Siciliae. Zeitschrift für Malakozoologie. 1: 100-112

Phasianellidae
Gastropods described in 1829
Molluscs of the Atlantic Ocean
Molluscs of the Mediterranean Sea
Molluscs of the Azores
Gastropods of Cape Verde